Owerrinta is a town in Isiala Ngwa South local government area of Abia State, Nigeria. It is a satellite town along Owerri /Onitsha Express Way. The town also harbors the Anglican cathedral of Isialangwa South Diocese.

Towns in Abia State